A list of films produced in Italy in 2006 (see 2006 in film):

External links
Italian films of 2006 at the Internet Movie Database

2006
Films
Italian